The 1992–93 Ukrainian Transitional League season was the first season of the fourth tier which existed for the next three years. The League was organized after the split of the 1992 Transfer League into the Second League and the Transitional League.

A total of eighteen teams participated in the competition, ten of which contested the 1992 season in the Ukrainian Second League and the remaining eight were promoted from the KFK competition (Amateurs). The competition began on August 15, 1992, with eight games. After the 17th round (November 17, 1992) the competition was retired for a winter break until April 3, 1993. The competition concluded on July 3, 1993.

Teams

Location

Stadiums and managers

Renamed teams 
 Prior to the season Andezyt Khust changed its name to Fetrovyk Khust
 Prior to the season Hirnyk Khartsyzk changed its name to Kanatchyk Khartsyzk and later to Silur Khartsyzk
 During the season Nyva Myronivka changed its name to Nyva-Borysfen Myronivka
 During the season Okean Kerch changed its name to Voykovets Kerch
 During the season Sokil Berezhany changed its name to Lysonia Berezhany
 During the season Hirnyk Hirne changed its name to Antratsyt Kirovske

Change of stadiums 
 Nyva since May 15, 1993, played its games in Kyiv at the CSKA Stadium
 Promin in the second half played its games in Rudky at the Motor Stadiuim and Kolos Stadium.
 More played all its games in Prymorskyi
 Naftokhimik played several games at the Lokomotyv Stadium in Komsomolsk and Dnipro Stadium in Kremenchuk
 Prometei Dz played several games at the Burevisnyk Stadium
 Prometei Sh played several games at the Olimp Stadium
 Lysonia played some of its games at the Sokil Stadium
 Olimpik played several games at the Serp i Molot Stadium
 Avanhard Stadium in Khust changed its name to Fetrovyk
 The game against Avanhard, Prometei Sh played in Torez at the Komsomolets Stadium
 The game against Nyva, Promin played in Staryi Sambir at the Prykarpattia Stadium, against Avanhard - in Rudky at the Motor Stadium
 The game against Dynamo, Antratsyt played in Hirne at the Hirnyk Stadium, against Torpedo in Zuhres at the ZMS Stadium
 The game against Torpedo, Naftokhimik played at the Dormash Stadium, against Prometei Sh - Syntez Stadium, against Olimpik - in Komsomolsk at the Lokomotyv Stadium
 The game against More, Elektron played in Sumy at the Krystal Stadium
 The game against Torpedo, Lysonia played at the Sokil Stadium

Final standings

Volodymyr Suprunenko case 
FC Silur Khartsyzk had several games changed into a technical loss (-:+) as the club used a player from Shakhtar Horlivka (Suprunenko). Several opponents of Silur Khartsyzk received a technical victory (+:-) (Antratsyt - Round 18 on April 3, Shakhtar - Round 22 on April 24)

Fetrovyk scandal 
On May 22, 1993 Fetrovyk Khust did not arrive for the game of the Round 27 with Prometei Shakhtarsk and it was awarded a technical loss (-:+). On June 5, 1993, during the game of the Round 29 against Frunzenets Frunze, the team of Fetrovyk Khust walked of the pitch on the 25th minute in the protest of a referee's decision.

Top scorers 
 Oleh Holubev (Antratsyt Kirovske) - 14
 Kostiantyn Pinchuk (Dynamo Luhansk) - 14
 Zamir Selimov (Frunzenets Frunze) - 14 (3)
 Andriy Zolotaryov (Shakhtar Horlivka) - 12 (1)
 Mykhailo Pysko (Promin Sambir) - 11
 Volodymyr Malyovanets (Naftokhimik Kremenchuk) - 11 (3)

See also
 Ukrainian Second League 1992–93
 Ukrainian First League 1992–93
 Amateur championship 1992-1993
 1992-93 Ukrainian Cup

References

External links 
Table and all the game reports 

Ukrainian Third League seasons
4
Ukra